Twiddle is an American rock band.  They are a jam band, and utilize instrumental improvisation in their live performances.  They incorporate influences from a variety of music genres, including rock, jazz, bluegrass, reggae, and funk.

History
Twiddle formed at Castleton State College in Vermont in 2004. The members of the band are Mihali Savoulidis (guitar, vocals), Ryan Dempsey (keyboards, vocals), Zdenek Gubb (bass, vocals), and Brook Jordan (drums, percussion, vocals).

Twiddle holds an annual festival called Tumble Down at Burlington Waterfront Park in Vermont.

On April 20, 2018 Twiddle appeared on The Dan Patrick Show and was announced as the "house band".

In 2022, Jordan took a hiatus from the band, Kung Fu's Adrian Tramontano is currently filling in for Jordan.

On November 29th 2022, Savoulidis announced that the band will be taking an indefinite hiatus for the foreseeable future with 2023 being their last year touring.

Discography
The Natural Evolution of Consciousness – 2007
Somewhere on the Mountain – 2011
Live at Nectar's – 2014
Plump: Chapter One – 2015; remastered and rereleased in 2017
Plump: Chapter Two – 2017
Live from Tumble Down 2018 – 2018
Every Last Leaf - 2022

References

External links

Jam bands
Rock music groups from Vermont
Musical groups established in 2004